Cristian Iordache is a Romanian water polo coach. He was the head coach of the Great Britain men's national water polo team at the 2012 Summer Olympics.

References

External links
 

Year of birth missing (living people)
Living people
Romanian male water polo players
Romanian water polo coaches
Great Britain men's national water polo team coaches
Water polo coaches at the 2012 Summer Olympics
Romanian expatriate sportspeople in England